A list of members of the National Collegiate Athletic Association (NCAA) Division I that do not currently sponsor college baseball programs.

American University (discontinued 1986) 
Boise State University (discontinued in 1980, restored for 2020, discontinued again in 2020)
Boston University (discontinued 1995)
University at Buffalo (discontinued 2017)
University of Tennessee at Chattanooga (aka "Chattanooga") (discontinued 1982)
Chicago State University (discontinued 2020)
Cleveland State University (sponsored 1932–2011)
Colgate University (discontinued 1996)
University of Colorado (discontinued 1980)
Colorado State University (discontinued 1992) 
DePaul University
University of Denver (discontinued 1999)
University of Detroit Mercy (sponsored 1941–2004)
Drake University (discontinued 1974)
Drexel University (sponsored 1929–2003)
Duquesne University (discontinued 2010)
Eastern Washington University (discontinued 1990)
Furman University (discontinued 2020)
University of Wisconsin-Green Bay (aka "Green Bay")
Hampton University (discontinued 1972) 
Howard University (discontinued 1999)
University of Idaho (discontinued 1980)
Idaho State University (discontinued 1974)
Iowa State University (sponsored 1892–2001)
IUPUI (discontinued 2001)
La Salle University (discontinued 2021)
Loyola University Chicago
Loyola University Maryland (discontinued 1979)
Marquette University
University of Missouri-Kansas City (aka "Kansas City")
University of Montana (discontinued 1972)
Montana State University (discontinued 1971) 
Morgan State University (discontinued 2001) 
University of New Hampshire (sponsored 1911–1997)
University of North Dakota (discontinued 2016) 
University of North Texas (sponsored 1920–1925; 1984–1988) 
University of Northern Iowa (discontinued 2009)
Northern Arizona University (discontinued 1981)
North Carolina Central University (discontinued 2021)
Portland State University (discontinued 1998)
Providence College (discontinued 1999)
Robert Morris University
St. Francis College (NY) (discontinued 2006)
Saint Francis University (PA)
South Carolina State University (discontinued 1974)
Southern Methodist University (sponsored 1919–1980)
Southern Utah University (discontinued 2012)
University of South Dakota (discontinued 2004)
Syracuse University (discontinued 1972)
Temple University (discontinued 2014)
Tennessee State University (discontinued 1993) 
University of Tulsa (sponsored 1965–1979)
Utah State University (discontinued 1968) 
University of Texas at El Paso (UTEP; discontinued 1985)
University of Vermont (discontinued 2009)
Weber State University (sponsored 1962–1974) 
University of Wisconsin–Madison (sponsored 1918–1991)
University of Wyoming (discontinued 1996)

See also
List of NCAA Division I schools that have never sponsored football
List of defunct college football teams
List of defunct college basketball teams
List of defunct college hockey teams
List of NCAA Division I baseball programs

D
College

Defunct college
College